Benjamin Heller was an English-American lawyer and politician, who is known for his work in creating the New York City Code of Ethics and for serving as the 10th Mayor of Flower Hill, New York.

Biography

Birth 
Heller was born in Liverpool, England, ca. 1905.

Education 
For college, Heller attended New York University, and served as the Senior President of the Student Council of New York University. After graduating from New York University, Heller then attended Harvard Law School, where he earned his bachelor's degree in law in 1929.

Career 
After graduating from Harvard, Heller began working as a lawyer, and joined the Brooklyn-based firm of Meier Steinbrink. When Steinbrink was elected as a New York State Supreme Court Justice in 1932, Heller became his law secretary.

In the 1950s, Heller served as counsel to the New York City Council. During this time, Heller was one of the participants in the creation of the New York City Code of Ethics, and was associated with Stanley Kruetzer in the creation of the ethics code.

In 1962, Heller served as a special arbitrator in the dispute between the Marine Engineers Beneficial Association and American Export–Isbrandtsen Lines. In this dispute, Heller ruled in favor of the engineers, concluding that the union's contract must remain in place once Isbrandtsen's fleet got transferred to American Export Lines. Heller was selected to be the special arbitrator for the ruling because the regular arbitrator for matters relating to contract disputes, Dr. Donald F. Shaughnessy, was unable to participate.

Mayor of Flower Hill, New York (1963–1970) 
On March 19, 1963, Heller was elected as the 10th Mayor of the Village of Flower Hill. He served in this capacity until 1970, when he was succeeded by George B. Higgins.

Prior to serving as the Mayor of Flower Hill, Heller had served for many years as a trustee for the village.

Death 
Heller died on May 13, 1974, at North Shore University Hospital in Manhasset, New York, after a long battle with an illness. He is buried at Beth David Cemetery in Farmingdale, New York.

Personal life 
At the time of his death, Heller lived at 166 Hemlock Road in Flower Hill.

Heller was married to Ruth. Together, they had three children: Susan, Carole, and Richard.

See also 

 List of New York University alumni
 List of Harvard University people

References 

Flower Hill, New York
People from Liverpool
British emigrants to the United States
Harvard Law School alumni
New York University alumni
1900s births
1974 deaths